Thomas Perowne may refer to:
 Thomas Perowne (died 1913) (1824–1913), Archdeacon of Norwich
 Thomas Perowne (died 1954) (1889–1954), Archdeacon of Norwich